San Miguel District may refer to:

 San Miguel District, Lima, in Peru
 San Miguel District, San Miguel, Peru
 San Miguel District, Manila
 San Miguel District, Paraguay, in Misiones Department, Paraguay
 San Miguel District, Cañas, in Cañas (canton), Guanacaste province, Costa Rica
 San Miguel District, Desamparados, in Desamparados (canton), San José province, Costa Rica
 San Miguel District, Naranjo, in Naranjo (canton), Alajuela province, Costa Rica
 San Miguel District, Santo Domingo, in the Santo Domingo canton, Heredia province, Costa Rica